Disparity and disparities may refer to:

in healthcare:
 Health disparities 

in finance:
 Income disparity between females and males.
Male–female income disparity in the United States
Income gender gap
 Economic inequality
 Income inequality metrics
 International inequality
 Income inequality in the United States
 Wealth inequality in the United States

in science:
 Stereopsis, the perception of depth and structure derived from binocular vision
 Binocular disparity, binocular cue to determine depth or distance of an object
 Ecological disparity, the number of different guilds occupying an ecosystem
 Running disparity, the number of 1 bits minus the number of 0 bits
 Paired disparity code, a pattern that keeps the running disparity close to zero

in social science:
 Social inequality 
 Social equality
 Social stratification
 Curvilinear Disparity is a political theory which posits that the rank and file members of a party tend to be more ideological than both the leadership of that party and its voters.